Adrian Hennigan is a British film critic. He is best known for his work with the BBC and Popcorn.net as a film reviewer. He currently lives in Israel and writes for Haaretz, serving as the television critic for the paper's English-language edition.

References

External links
Reviews at the BBC

British film critics
BBC people
Living people
Year of birth missing (living people)